Kirchbichl is a municipality in the Kufstein District in the Austrian state of Tyrol located 10 km south of Kufstein and 3 km northeast above Wörgl. It has six parts and its main source of income is cement industry.

Climate

Population

References

External links
 Official website

Cities and towns in Kufstein District